Camp Creek State Park was created in 1987 by dividing the  area from Camp Creek State Forest.  Camp Creek State Park is located about two miles (3 km) from the Camp Creek Exit (Exit 20) of I-77 in Mercer County, West Virginia.

Features 
 3 campgrounds
 Mash Fork - 26 camping sites for tents or trailers
 Blue Jay - 14 rustic sites
 Double "C" - Horse and Ride sites
 Picnic area
 Fishing
 Hunting
 Horseback riding

See also

List of West Virginia state parks
State park

References

External links 

 

Protected areas of Mercer County, West Virginia
State parks of West Virginia
Protected areas established in 1987
Campgrounds in West Virginia
1987 establishments in West Virginia